Kai van Hese (born 15 June 1989 in The Hague) is a Dutch footballer who plays as a left back for Noordwijk in the Dutch Topklasse.

External links
 Player profile at Voetbal International

1989 births
Living people
Dutch footballers
ADO Den Haag players
FC Dordrecht players
Eredivisie players
Eerste Divisie players
Derde Divisie players
Footballers from The Hague
Association football fullbacks